Frank Dunklee Currier (October 30, 1853 – November 25, 1921) was an American politician and a U.S. Representative from New Hampshire.

Early life
Born in Canaan, New Hampshire, Currier attended the common schools, then Kimball Union Academy in Meriden, New Hampshire, and Doctor Hixon's School in Lowell, Massachusetts.

Currier read law with Mr. Pike of Franklin and was admitted to the bar at Concord in April, 1874, commencing practice in Canaan, New Hampshire.

Career
Currier served as member of the New Hampshire House of Representatives in 1879 and was secretary of the Republican state committee, 1882-1890. He served as clerk of the New Hampshire Senate in 1883 and 1885 and was a delegate to the Republican National Convention in 1884. He continued as member of the state senate in 1887, serving as president of that body.  He was appointed and served as naval officer of customs at the port of Boston from 1890 to 1894, then returned to New Hampshire to be speaker of the New Hampshire House of Representatives in 1899. He received an honorary Master of Arts degree from Dartmouth in 1901.

Elected as a Republican to the Fifty-seventh and to the five succeeding congresses, Currier served as United States Representative for the second district of New Hampshire (March 4, 1901 – March 3, 1913). He served as chairman of the Committee on Patents (Fifty-eighth through Sixty-first congresses). During his tenure, a new copyright law was passed in 1909.   He was an unsuccessful candidate for reelection in 1912 to the Sixty-third Congress and retired from public life.

Appointed by Governor Felker as Justice of the Police Court in 1913, Currier served for two years.

Death
Currier died in Canaan, New Hampshire, on November 25, 1921. He is interred at Canaan Street Cemetery, Canaan, New Hampshire.

Family life
Son of Horace S. and Emma (Plastridge), Currier was married to Adelaide H. Sargent on May 31, 1890.

References

External links

1853 births
1921 deaths
Republican Party members of the New Hampshire House of Representatives
New Hampshire lawyers
Republican Party New Hampshire state senators
Presidents of the New Hampshire Senate
Speakers of the New Hampshire House of Representatives
Republican Party members of the United States House of Representatives from New Hampshire
People from Canaan, New Hampshire
19th-century American lawyers